Cem Anhan, known professionally as Capo or Capo Azzlack, is a German rapper. He is the younger brother of the rapper Haftbefehl.

Life and career 
Anhan was born in Offenbach am Main, Germany.  He grew up in a Turkish-speaking household, raised by a Turkish mother (from Giresun) and a Zaza–Kurdish father from East Turkish province Tunceli. Anhan's father committed suicide when he was nine years old. Anhan's older brother Aykut Anhan, known as Haftbefehl fled to Istanbul in 2006, because of an impending imprisonment.

Haftbefehl released his second studio album Kanackis in February 2012. Capo had s guestpart on the song Party mit uns. Capo released his first single as a lead artist, "Hater / Erzähl' ma" on 19 August 2013. His first studio album, Hallo Monaco was released on 4 October 2013 and debuted on number 21 of the German albumcharts. He went into a hiatus following his album release. In April 2017, he announced his second studio album, Alles auf Rot, which was released on 7 July 2017. The album reached the top 10 in Germany, Austria and Switzerland.

Discography

Studio albums

Collaborative albums

Singles

References 

German rappers
German people of Turkish descent
German people of Kurdish descent
Living people
Year of birth missing (living people)